JSNab 17 or the epitaph of Raqosh is a funerary inscription from Mada'in Salih, Saudi Arabia. It is dated to 267 AD and written in a mix of Nabataean Aramaic and Arabic. Besides the language, it is notable for the use of the possibly monotheistic epithet mry ʕlmʔ 'the Lord of the World'.

Text and translation 
The inscription is read by Cantineau as follows:

1 th qbrw ṣnʕh kʕbw br

2 ḥrtt lrqwš brt

3 ʕbdmnwtw ʔmh why

4 hlkt py ʔlḥgrw

5 šnt mʔh wštyn

6 wtryn byrḥ tmwz wlʕn

7 mry ʕlmʔ mn yšnʔ ʔlqbrw

8 dʔ wmn yptḥh ḥšy w

9 wldh wlʕn mn yʕyr dʔ ʕly mnh

Cantineau gives the following translation (translated here from French):

"This is a tomb which Kaʿabô son (2) of Ḥaretat (1) made (2) for Raqôš daughter of (3) ʿAbdmanôtô, his mother. She (4) died in Ḥegrâ, (5) in the year one hundred and sixty-(6)two, in the month of Tammûz. And may (7) the Lord of the World (6) curse (7) whoever alters this tomb (8) and whoever opens it, other than (9) her offspring, and may He curse whoever alters what is on it."

O'Connor reads dnh instead of th (1), dy instead of w (8), and yqbr wʔʕly instead of yʕyr dʔ ʕly (9). This yields:

"S1. (a) This is the grave which Kaʿb bar Haritat made. (b) This is a grave which Kaʿb bar Haritat made. (c) As for this grave, Kaʿb bar Haritat made it. for Raqāsh berat ʿAbd-Manāt, his mother. S2. And she died in al-Hijr (in the) year 162 in the month of Tammuz. S3. And may Marē ʿAlma curse him who opens this tomb or alters it, save for him whom he (Kaʿb) has begotten/his progeny. S4. And may he curse anyone who buries (anyone else in it) or exhumes (anyone) from it."

Language 
Referring to the mixing of Aramaic and Arabic, O'Connor states that "the Raqāsh Epitaph is closer to being a polyglot puzzle than Nabatean plain text".

References 

Funerary texts